Franz Ortner (born 12 November 1905, date of death unknown) was an Austrian speed skater. He competed in the men's 10,000 metres at the 1936 Winter Olympics.

References

1905 births
Year of death missing
Austrian male speed skaters
Olympic speed skaters of Austria
Speed skaters at the 1936 Winter Olympics
Place of birth missing